Hans Malmstrøm (15 November 1912 – 15 September 1990) was a Danish swimmer who won a bronze medal in the 200 m breaststroke at the 1934 European Aquatics Championships. He competed in the same event at the 1936 Summer Olympics, but did not reach the final.

References

1912 births
1990 deaths
Danish male breaststroke swimmers
Swimmers at the 1936 Summer Olympics
Olympic swimmers of Denmark
European Aquatics Championships medalists in swimming
Sportspeople from Frederiksberg